Sainte-Alauzie (Languedocien: Senta Alàusia) is a former commune in the Lot department in south-western France. On 1 January 2017, it was merged into the new commune Castelnau-Montratier-Sainte-Alauzie. Its population was 106 in 2019.

See also
Communes of the Lot department

References

External links

Official Web site

Saintealauzie